Reshamlal Jangade (रेशम लाल जांगड़े) (1925-2014) was an Indian Lawyer and politician.

Career 

B.A., LL.B. [B.J.P.—Madhya Pradesh, Bilaspur, 1989]:  s. of late Tika Ram Jangde; b. at Parsadih, Raipur District, Madhya Pradesh, February 15, 1925; ed. at Chhattisgarh Arts College, Raipur, Madhya Pradesh, University College of Law, Nagpur, Maharashtra; m. Kamla, May 15, 1958, 3 s. and 2 d.; Agriculturist, Lawyer, Political and Social Worker, Religious Missionary, Diplomat; suffered imprisonment in 1942;

Public offices held:  deputy minister, Madhya Pradesh, 1963;

Previous association with political parties:  executive member, Congress Parliamentary Party, 1955; vice-president, BJP, Madhya Pradesh, 1985–86; dy. leader, BJP, Madhya Pradesh, 1986–87;

Previous membership:  provisional parliament, January 1950—February 1952, First Lok Sabha, 1952–57, Second Lok Sabha, 1957–62; legislative assembly, Madhya Pradesh (Bhatgaon constituency), 1962–67, 1972–77 and March 1985—November 1989;

Committee experience:  member, estimates committee, 1957–58, select committee on code of criminal procedure amendment bill, 1959; chairman, committee on private members' bills and resolutions, 1974–75, Madhya Pradesh legislative assembly; member, public accounts committee, 1974–75, estimates committee, 1985–86, committee of privileges, 1987, committee on the welfare of SC & ST, 1987–88, committee on questions references, 1988 and rules committee, 1989, Madhya Pradesh legislative assembly; member, committee on papers laid on the table, January 19, 1990, and consultative committee, ministry of law and justice, 1990;

Favourite pastime and recreation:  reading, dance and songs;

Sports and clubs:  football, kabaddi, volley-ball, yogasan;

Social activities:  efforts to make villages self-reliant; non-exploitation of migrant labour in the coal mines of Bihar, removal of untouchability and dowry system; a leading social and political reformer of Satnami sect in India; set up Panchayats to arrange marriage among Satnamis; removal of animal sacrifice and superstitious practices; encouraging Harijans to participate in community lunch and religious function of the caste Hindus; director, Harijan Education Society which runs 15 hostels for Harijans in M.P. from 1955 to 1963 with 1100 students; restoration of land to tribal people, undertook padyatras covering about 3000 villages in Chhattisgarh region for rural upliftment;

Other information:  mMember, committee on social welfare studies under the central planning commission, 1957–59; a researcher on Guru Ghasidas; founder-leader, Guru Ghasidas Pilgrim Mela; founder of Satnami sect in Chhattisgarh, Bihar;

Permanent address: Janta Quarters—I, Indravati Colony, Raipur, Madhya Pradesh.

references :-

References

http://loksabhaph.nic.in/writereaddata/biodata_1_12/756.htm

https://www.outlookindia.com/magazine/story/still-charged-up-after-all-these-years/290727

1925 births
2014 deaths
Madhya Pradesh MLAs 1962–1967
Bharatiya Janata Party politicians from Madhya Pradesh
Lok Sabha members from Madhya Pradesh
India MPs 1952–1957
India MPs 1957–1962
India MPs 1989–1991
People from Bilaspur, Chhattisgarh
Indian National Congress politicians
Madhya Pradesh MLAs 1985–1990
Indian National Congress politicians from Madhya Pradesh